The 1992 Gent–Wevelgem was the 54th edition of the Gent–Wevelgem cycle race and was held on 8 April 1992. The race started in Ghent and finished in Wevelgem. The race was won by Mario Cipollini of the GB–MG Maglificio team.

General classification

Notes

References

Gent–Wevelgem
1992 in road cycling
1992 in Belgian sport